Formula Kite is the kitesurfing class chosen by World Sailing for 2024 Summer Olympics. The class features a foil kite and a board with a hydrofoil. The equipment is not one-design, but instead competitors use their choice of approved production equipment. The International Kiteboarding Association (IKA) manages the class. The class is for men and women.

See also 
 Windfoiling

References 

Olympic sailing classes
Hydrofoils